Rolf Theodor Heinz Mulka (23 November 1927 – 14 July 2012) was a German sailor. He won the Olympic Bronze Medal  Flying Dutchman in   1960 Rome along with Ingo von Bredow.

Mulka was the son of Robert Mulka who at the Auschwitz concentration camp, was adjutant to the camp commandant, SS-Obersturmbannführer Rudolf Höss.

References

External links
 
 
 

1927 births
2012 deaths
German male sailors (sport)
Olympic sailors of the United Team of Germany
Olympic bronze medalists for the United Team of Germany
Olympic medalists in sailing
Sailors at the 1956 Summer Olympics – 12 m2 Sharpie
Sailors at the 1960 Summer Olympics – Flying Dutchman
Medalists at the 1960 Summer Olympics
Flying Dutchman class world champions
World champions in sailing for Germany